Jeffrey Falcon (born January 1, 1962) is an American actor appearing in martial arts films.  His most notable starring role was in the film Six-String Samurai.

Filmography
Operation Pink Squad (1988)
The Inspector Wears Skirts (1988)
Prince of the Sun (1989)
The Inspector Wears Skirts 2 (1989)
Burning Ambition (1989)
Blonde Fury (1989)
The Outlaw Brothers (1990)
Lethal Contact (1992)
Caged Beauties (1992)
The Way of the Lady Boxers (1993)
Rape in Public Sea (1993)
Happy Partner (1993)
Oh! Yes Sir! (1994)
Six-String Samurai (1998)
Fists Of Doobage (2001)
Last Texas Avenger (2004)

References

External links

1962 births
Living people
American male film actors
American expatriates in Hong Kong